Tara is a 2010 Bengali drama film directed and produced by Bratya Basu.This film released on 5 November 2010 under the banner Shree Venkatesh Films. The film's music was composed by Tapan Sinha and Rabindranath Tagore.

Cast
 Paoli Dam
 Tota Ray Chowdhury
 Bratya Basu
 Goutam Halder
 Prosenjit Chatterjee
 Parthasarathi Deb
 Piya Sengupta

Soundtrack

References

External links
 
 Tara (2010 film) in Gomolo

2010 films
Bengali-language Indian films
2010 drama films
2010s Bengali-language films
Indian drama films
Films directed by Bratya Basu